Kenneth Roy De Groot (October 16, 1929 – April 22, 1993) was an American politician who sat in the Iowa House of Representatives between 1979 and 1993 as a member of the Republican Party. He held the District 1 seat until 1983, when he began representing District 8.

De Groot was born in Perkins, Iowa on October 16, 1929. He was a graduate of Hull High School, and pursued tertiary education at Iowa State University and Northwestern College. After college, De Groot became a dairy farmer for 42 years. Alongside his sons, De Groot owned and operated DG Valley-View Farms. De Groot held membership and executive positions in several agricultural collectives, companies, and associations, among them, 4-H, the Dairy Herd Improvement Association, the Land O'Lakes Northwest Iowa Dairy Division, and the Farm Bureau.

De Groot served in the Iowa House of Representatives between 1979 and 1993 as a member of the Republican Party. He held the District 1 seat until 1983, when he began representing District 8. De Groot died on April 22, 1993, months after completing his seventh and final term in office.

References

1929 births
1993 deaths
20th-century American politicians
Republican Party members of the Iowa House of Representatives
Farmers from Iowa
People from Hull, Iowa
Iowa State University alumni
Northwestern College (Iowa) alumni
Dairy farmers